Year 892 (DCCCXCII) was a leap year starting on Saturday (link will display the full calendar) of the Julian calendar.

Events 
 By place 

 Europe 
 Summer – Poppo II, duke of Thuringia (Central Germany), is deposed by King Arnulf of Carinthia. East Frankish forces and their Magyar (Hungarian) allies invade Great Moravia.
 Vladimir, ruler (knyaz) of the Bulgarian Empire, signs a military alliance with Arnulf of Carinthia of the East Frankish Kingdom. This alliance works against the pro-Byzantine policy of his father. 

 Britain 
 Autumn – A Viking force with a fleet of 250 longships arrives at the river mouth of the settlement of Lympne (East Kent). They attack the small fortification (called Eorpeburnan).
 Viking raiders (80 ships) under Hastein arrive in the Thames Estuary, and set up camp at Middleton. King Alfred the Great decides to position his army in the Wealden Forest.

 Arabian Empire     
 April – Al-Mu'tadid, the de facto regent of the Abbasid Caliphate, removes his cousin Al-Mufawwad from succession. He becomes caliph himself, after the death of Al-Mu'tamid, returning the capital from Samarra to Baghdad.
 May – Ibrahim II, Aghlabid emir of Ifriqiya, sends a large army to Palermo, to impose Arab authority from Kairouan. After an uprising, the Sicilians make a bid for independence.
 Summer – The Persian nobility installs Isma'il ibn Ahmad, the former governor of Transoxiana, as ruler (emir) of the Samanid Empire, after the death of his brother Nasr I.

 Asia 
 Former Silla general Gyeon Hwon seizes the cities of Wansanju and Mujinju, taking over the territory of Baekje. He wins the support of the people, and declares himself king.

Births 
 March 30 – Shi Jingtang, founder of the Later Jin Dynasty (d. 942)
 Ai (Li Zhou), emperor (puppet ruler) of the Tang Dynasty (d. 908)
 Ali ibn Buya, founder of the Buyid Dynasty (or 891)
 Dou Zhengu, Chinese official and chancellor (d. 969)
 Guibert, founder of Gembloux Abbey (d. 962)
 Jing Yanguang, Chinese general and governor (d. 947)
 Saadia Gaon, Jewish philosopher and exegete (or 882)
 Wang Sitong, Chinese general and governor (d. 934)
 Wang Yuanying, crown prince of Former Shu (d. 913)
 Zhang, empress consort of Zhu Youzhen (d. 915)

Deaths 
 October 9 – Al-Tirmidhi, Persian scholar and hadith compiler (b. 824)
 October 15 – Al-Mu'tamid, Muslim caliph of the Abbasid Caliphate
 Berengaudus, Frankish Benedictine monk (b. 840)
 Bernard, illegitimate son of Charles the Fat (or 891)
 Branimir, ruler (knyaz) of Croatia (approximate date)
 Nasr I, Muslim emir of the Samanid Empire
 Sigurd Eysteinsson, Norse Earl of Orkney
 Sun Ru, Chinese warlord and governor
 Yang Shouliang, Chinese warlord and governor
 Zhao Deyin, Chinese warlord and chancellor

References

Sources